Guildford Synagogue refers both to a probably medieval synagogue and to a modern congregation in Guildford, Surrey, England.

Medieval synagogue
Jews probably arrived in Guildford during the 12th century. It is widely believed that they built a synagogue (circa 1180) in the High Street, on a site that is now owned by the retail outlet Accessorize. There is a small plaque outside the shop to mark the spot.

In 1995, during excavations at the site of the old synagogue, archaeologists led by Mary Alexander of the Guildford Museum found a chamber with steps down from street level. It was ornately decorated with pattern designs. In the east of the room is an alcove and a pillar where scorch marks demonstrate that a light was often burning in this place. The assumption is that the alcove is the Aron Kodesh (Holy Ark) and that the mark is left from a Ner Tamid (Everlasting Light).

Being the only chamber of its kind in England, there has been much dispute over its use, but the most popular theory and all the evidence points towards the probability that Guildford has the oldest synagogue remains in the British Isles and one of the oldest in Western Europe.

Today, the modern synagogue contains a stone, presented by Guildford Museum, of the original synagogue. The actual chamber is under concrete although both the owners of the site and local historians have expressed their regret at it not having a glass floor.

Modern synagogue
In 1979, having borrowed halls for years, land was bought and the community modified the building on the site to build its own synagogue. The Chief Rabbi, Immanuel Jakobovits, opened and consecrated the synagogue. To mark the occasion when the Chief Rabbi inaugurated the synagogue, a plaque was laid by Theo Rubin who was the President of the community for many years. Chief Rabbi Sir Jonathan Sacks visited the synagogue in 2006.

Surrey Multifaith Centre

The University of Surrey announced plans in 2007 to build a multifaith centre on their Stag Hill Campus. The plans include a Jewish Common Room–Synagogue with a Sukkah and mikvah within the centre. The chaplaincy team at the University of Surrey are advocates of the centre which has won the backing of leading religious figures in the UK. The Jewish chaplain Alexander Goldberg has been an advocate for the centre within the Jewish community and beyond.

See also
List of Jewish communities in the United Kingdom
List of places of worship in the Borough of Guildford
List of synagogues in the United Kingdom

References

External links
Guildford Jewish Community website
Guildford Jewish Community and Guildford Synagogue on Jewish Communities and Records – UK (hosted by jewishgen.org).

12th-century establishments in England
12th-century synagogues
1979 establishments in England
Buildings and structures in Guildford
History of Surrey
Medieval synagogues in England
Orthodox synagogues in England
Religion in Surrey